Liddle is a surname. Notable people with the surname include:

 Andrew R. Liddle (born 1965), professor of astrophysics at the University of Sussex in Brighton
 Ben Liddle (born 1998), English footballer
 Bobby Liddle (1908–1972), English footballer
 Brett Liddle (born 1970), golfer from South Africa
 Cain Liddle (born 1975), Australian rules footballer
 Celeste Liddle (born 1978), Australian Indigenous feminist and unionist
 Chris Liddle (born 1984), English cricket player
 Craig Liddle (born 1971), English former footballer
 Danny Liddle (1912–1982), Scottish footballer
 David Liddle, co-founder of Interval Research Corporation
 Don Liddle (1925–2000), American left-handed pitcher for the New York Giants
 Donald Liddle (1906–1989), Scottish corporate director
 Fred Liddle (1910–?), English professional association football
 Gareth Liddle, English footballer
 Gary Liddle, footballer currently playing for Chesterfield
 Gavin Liddle (born 1963), English footballer
 Grant Liddle (1921–1989), American endocrinologist
 Jack Liddle (1910–?), Canadian middle-distance runner
 Jacob Liddle (born 1996), Australian rugby league footballer
 James Liddle (1930–1959), South African cricketer
 Jeremy Liddle, bass guitarist of Canadian pop punk band Faber Drive
 Jim Liddle (born 1958), Scottish footballer
 Ken Liddle (1928–1998), English footballer
 Madhulika Liddle (born 1973), Indian writer
 Martin Liddle (born 1978), New Zealand wrestler
 Michael Liddle (born 1989), footballer
 Peter Liddle, historian and author
 Rod Liddle (born 1960), British journalist best known for his term as editor of BBC Radio 4 's Today programme
 Roger Liddle, Baron Liddle, British political adviser
 Stephen Liddle, English professor of inorganic chemistry
 Steve Liddle (born 1959), Major League Baseball bench coach for the Minnesota Twins
 Tom Liddle (1921–1994), English footballer
 Tony Liddle (born 1940), truck driver and tour guide
 William Liddle (1888–1959), pastoralist

See also
 Liddell, another surname